Colorado Air and Space Port , formerly known as Front Range Airport, is a public airport located in unincorporated Adams County, Colorado, in the United States, adjacent to Aurora and  southeast of Denver International Airport. Colorado Air and Space Port serves the Denver-Aurora-Lakewood, CO Metropolitan Statistical Area. The postal designation of Watkins, a nearby unincorporated community, is used in the airport's mailing address.

Colorado Air and Space Port ICAO/FAA identifiers are KCFO/CFO. The airport has no IATA designation.

Colorado Air and Space Port is a small general aviation airport, although increased demand has warranted several expansion programs in recent years. Currently, the airport serves as the base of a few flying schools, flight clubs, maintenance services, and air rescue training facilities. Due to its location on the flat plains of eastern Colorado, as well as generally cheaper aircraft rental rates, it is a very popular airport for both flight training and recreational flights. It is also popular among owners and pilots of kit-built aircraft, and the Experimental Aircraft Association (EAA) has a very strong presence at Colorado Air and Space Port, which frequently hosts the EAA Young Eagles Rallies.

In 2011, the State of Colorado applied to the FAA to certify Colorado Air and Space Port as a spaceport. The application was approved on August 17, 2018, and announced on August 20, 2018.

History 
Front Range Airport  opened in 1984 when the now demolished Stapleton International Airport  was the major air hub for the Denver metropolitan area. Until 2005, it was a non-towered airport without air traffic control (ATC) services when the tallest general aviation control tower in the United States (191 ft) was opened along with full ATC services.  After 19 years as airport director, Dennis Heap and the airport board parted ways in August 2013.  Heap was replaced in the late spring of 2014 by Dave Ruppel.  The airport was originally owned by the Front Range Airport Authority (FRAA), continuing until January 1, 2014, when the FRAA was dissolved and the airport and all employees were folded into Adams County government as a department.  Since then, the airport has seen a marked improvement in general aviation, air-taxi, military traffic as well as other air-based businesses, such as the helicopter-based businesses of Air Methods.

Facilities and aircraft 

For the 12-month ending December 31, 2019, the airport had 75,647 aircraft operations, an average of 207 per day: 98.5% general aviation, <1% air taxi and 1.4% military. There are 291 aircraft based at this airport: 85% single-engine, 13% multi-engine, 1% helicopters, <1% ultralight, and <1% jet aircraft.

The airport also hosts an armory belonging to the Colorado Army National Guard. HHC, 5th Battalion, 19th Special Forces Group is based there.  There are no military aircraft based at the airport.

Spaceport proposal
In October 2011, the Governor of Colorado, John Hickenlooper, formally requested that the federal government designate Colorado a "spaceport state" and that the airport be designated a spaceport for suborbital horizontal takeoff flights (HTVL and HTHL). 
Spaceport designation would allow a facility offering suborbital tourism, travel, and cargo transport from one point to another on Earth. The Denver Post reported that "No vertical launches are planned at the Front Range, unlike most of the other eight certified U.S. spaceports. Instead, space planes — an emerging technology — will use regular runways and jet engines to take off and land, switching to rocket power above 50,000 feet."

Media sources have suggested that the Sierra Nevada Dream Chaser spaceplane may be used for suborbital spaceflights and that Colorado Air and Space Port may prove to be the preferred location, over Spaceport America in New Mexico.

, news reports indicate that the Colorado Air and Space Port proposal is gaining traction with political interests at the state and federal levels as well as with industry participants. 
One of those commercial interests was XCOR Aerospace, which was considering Spaceport Colorado as a candidate for HTHL operations with their Lynx rocketplane.
However, XCOR announced in July 2012 that they would be moving their company headquarters and research and development activities to Texas, in part due to a significant set of financial incentives offered to XCOR by the Midland Development Corporation (MDC) and the Midland City Council.

, Colorado state law "grants limited liability to spaceflight companies, allowing spaceflight participants who sign waiver forms to sue only if they are injured or killed as a result of a firm’s 'willful or wanton disregard' for safety."

Spanish architect Luis Vidal produced an architectural concept for the new airport in 2013.

In December 2017, British aerospace company Reaction Engines began construction of a test facility at Colorado Air and Space Port for the development of its SABRE air-breathing rocket engine.

In December 2020, Japanese aerospace company PD AeroSpace signed an agreement with the Air and Space Port that paves the way toward test flights of high-altitude planes above the plains east of Aurora.

In October 2022 plans for Port Colorado, an industrial mixed-use development spanning 6,500 acres adjacent to Colorado Air and Space Port, were reported.

See also
 List of airports in Colorado

References

External links 
 
 Colorado Air and Space Port (CFO) at Colorado DOT airport directory
 
 

Airports in Colorado
Transportation buildings and structures in Aurora, Colorado
Buildings and structures in Adams County, Colorado